FDA v. Brown & Williamson Tobacco Corp., 529 U.S. 120 (2000), is an important United States Supreme Court case in the development of American administrative law. It ruled that the Food, Drug, and Cosmetic Act did not give the Food and Drug Administration (FDA) the authority to regulate tobacco products as "drugs" or "devices." This was later superseded by the Family Smoking Prevention and Tobacco Control Act, which granted the FDA the authority to regulate such products.

Legal principle

The scope of authority held by an agency is determined by the agency's organic statute.  Where Congress repeatedly denies an agency the power to regulate a particular area and develops a comprehensive regulatory scheme outside the agency's control, the agency may not regulate that area.

The approach, in this case, balances the approach of US v. Southwestern Cable Co..  Whereas Southwestern Cable allowed an agency to regulate areas not explicitly contemplated by the statute when necessary to fulfill its ultimate goal even when legislative efforts to gain such power failed, FDA does not allow agencies to regulate areas for which Congress has developed a separate statutory scheme.

Facts and procedural posture
The Food and Drug Administration (FDA) attempted to regulate tobacco products.  Tobacco companies, including Brown & Williamson and Philip Morris Companies (among others), challenged the regulations.  The District Court granted in part and denied in part the plaintiff's claim.  The Circuit Court reversed, ruling for the tobacco company.

The Supreme Court ultimately affirmed the Circuit Court's ruling for the tobacco company, ruling that the FDA did not have the power to enact and enforce the regulations in question.

Analysis
The FDA's authority to regulate came from the Food, Drug, and Cosmetic Act (FDCA).  The FDA argued that nicotine was a "drug" and cigarettes and smokeless tobacco are "devices" that deliver nicotine to the body within the meaning of the FDCA.  Congress had enacted several tobacco-specific laws after the FDCA, and the FDA had never exercised any control over tobacco.  The Court concluded that Congress did not intend to give the FDA the power to regulate tobacco and that the regulations were therefore invalid.

Further developments
This decision was overridden by the passage of the Family Smoking Prevention and Tobacco Control Act of 2009, which gave the FDA the authority to regulate the tobacco industry and control the level of nicotine in cigarettes.

See also
 List of United States Supreme Court cases, volume 529
 List of United States Supreme Court cases
 Lists of United States Supreme Court cases by volume
 Y1 (tobacco)

References

Further reading
Suing the Tobacco and Lead Pigment Industries: Government Litigation as Public Health Prescription by Donald G. Gifford. Ann Arbor, University of Michigan Press, 2010.

External links
 

United States administrative case law
United States Supreme Court cases
United States Supreme Court cases of the Rehnquist Court
United States tobacco case law
Food and Drug Administration
2000 in United States case law
Brown & Williamson
History of Louisville, Kentucky
Smoking in the United States